Southbridge Municipal Airport  is a public airport located two miles (3 km) north of the central business district (CBD) of the Town of Southbridge, a city in Worcester County, Massachusetts, USA. The airport is owned and operated by the Town of Southbridge and overseen by the Southbridge Municipal Airport Commission. The airport sustained damage on June 1 from the 2011 New England tornado outbreak.

References 
Airport Master Record (FAA Form 5010), also available as a printable form (PDF)

Notes

External links 

Airports in Worcester County, Massachusetts